The 1942 Macdonald Brier, the Canadian men's national curling championship, was held from March 2 to 5, 1942 at Quebec Arena in Quebec City, Quebec.

Team Manitoba, who was skipped by Ken Watson won the Brier Tankard by finishing round robin play with an 8-1 record. This was Manitoba's tenth Brier championship overall and the second Brier won by Watson's rink, who won their first Brier in 1936.

Both British Columbia and Ontario would finish tied for second with 7-2 records, which would've necessitated a tiebreaker playoff under Brier rules at the time. But due to the Quebec Aces hockey team needing the arena for their QSHL playoffs on March 7, it was announced that no tiebreaker playoff would be played and that the tie for second place would be allowed to stand. This prevented a showdown between brothers Gordon and Donald Campbell were skipping Ontario and BC respectively.

For the first time since the 1933 Brier, none of the games went to an extra end.

Quebec's loss in Draw 8 against British Columbia was their 22nd straight loss in Brier competition, setting a record for most consecutive Brier losses. The record was previously held by Prince Edward Island, who had lost 21 straight Brier games from 1937 to 1939. Quebec's losing streak would eventually reach 25 games before they would win a game again in 1946.

Due to the onset of World War II, the 1942 Brier would be the last Brier to be played until 1946. This would also be the only opportunity that Quebec Arena would host a Brier as the arena burnt down a few months later.

Conditions at the Arena were considered "tricky, almost unplayable".

Teams
The teams are listed as follows:

Round-robin standings

Round-robin results

Draw 1

Draw 2

Draw 3

Draw 4

Draw 5

Draw 6

Draw 7

Draw 8

Draw 9

References 

Macdonald Brier, 1942
Macdonald Brier, 1942
The Brier
Curling competitions in Quebec City
Macdonald Brier
Macdonald Brier
20th century in Quebec City